EQ Office is a real estate investment company that owns 80 office properties comprising 40 million square feet. The company is owned by funds managed by The Blackstone Group. The company was formerly known as Equity Office.

History
The company was founded in 1976 by Sam Zell. In 1997, the company acquired Lakeside Square in North Dallas for $60 million. In 2003, the company gained control of the San Francisco Ferry Building.

In 2005, the company sold 5 buildings in San Francisco for $400 million. The company also acquired a portfolio in California for $263 million. In 2006, the company acquired Pointe O'Hare I, an office building near O'Hare International Airport for $59 million and a property in Boca Raton, Florida for $29.5 million. The company also acquired half-interest in two Miami office buildings for $249.8 million.

In February 2007, after a bidding war with Vornado Realty Trust, funds managed by The Blackstone Group completed the acquisition of the company for $39 billion and sold 8 buildings to affiliates of Harry Macklowe for $7 billion. In April 2007, the company sold its portfolio in Washington, D.C. to Beacon Capital Partners for $6.5 billion. Later in 2013, the company acquired the Hughes Center, an office and retail development in Las Vegas, for $347 million.

In January 2014, the company sold 1-3 Center Plaza in Boston to Shorenstein Properties for $307 million. In April 2014, the company sold 28 State Street for $345 million. In December 2014, the company sold its portfolio in Silicon Valley to Hudson Pacific Properties for $3.5 billion. In 2015, the company acquired the Willis Tower for $1.3 billion.

In 2017, the company sold a property in San Jose, California for $82 million. The company also sold a two-building medical office campus in San Diego, California for $97 million. In June 2018, the company changed its name from Equity Office to EQ Office.

Investments
Notable properties owned by the company are as follows:

 100 Summer Street
 1740 Broadway
 350 North Orleans
 San Francisco Ferry Building
 Wells Fargo Center (Minneapolis)
 Willis Tower

References

Companies based in Chicago
Privately held companies based in Illinois
The Blackstone Group companies
Real estate companies of the United States
2007 mergers and acquisitions
1976 establishments in Illinois
Real estate companies established in 1976